Hanna Kuoppala (born 12 September 1975) is a Finnish retired ice hockey player. She played 87 matches with the Finnish national team, including the women's tournament at the 2006 Winter Olympics and the IIHF World Championships in 2001 and 2004.

Kuoppala won seven Finnish Championship gold medals with the Espoo Blues of Finland's Naisten SM-sarja. In Finland, she also played with Vaasan Sport and KalPa Kuopio.

References

External links
 

Living people
1975 births
People from Jakobstad
Finnish women's ice hockey defencemen
Olympic ice hockey players of Finland
Ice hockey players at the 2006 Winter Olympics
Sportspeople from Ostrobothnia (region)